In Defense of Looting: A Riotous History of Uncivil Action is a 2019 book by Vicky Osterweil and published by Bold Type Books. Osterweil wrote the book in response to the Ferguson unrest in 2014 and 2015.

In the book, Osterweil argues that looting is a tool that results in positive change to society and that looting helps redistribute property and wealth in an unequal society, which she calls "fighting racial capitalism." Osterweil also observes in the book that "those who participate in rioting and looting tend to be the most politically informed and socially engaged in the neighborhood".

Osterweil denounces nonviolence in the book, stating that when it is "pushed as a philosophical, moral, or religious principle, it gains a nasty, authoritarian edge." She also denounces local politicians and political groups who advocate for limiting looting during uprisings.

Reception 
In August 2020, Bret Stephens, a conservative journalist for The New York Times, said that "'In Defense of Looting' is not an interesting book. It speaks for almost nobody beyond the fringe left — and certainly not for looters who hadn't thought about 'cisheteropatriarchalism.'"

In a September 2020 review, Graeme Wood, a staff writer for The Atlantic, called the book "The Pinnacle of Looting Apologia", saying that "If the real, lasting change you wish to effect is burning society to cinders and crippling for a generation its ability to serve its poorest citizens, then I suppose I am forced to agree."

References

Further reading

External link
"In Defense of Looting" by Vicky Osterweil, The New Inquiry, 2014

2019 non-fiction books
English-language books
Books about human rights
Books about race and ethnicity
Police brutality in the United States
Verso Books books
Civil rights movement
American history books
American political books
Looting